Wigan Borough F.C. was an English football club based in the town of Wigan. The club was founded in 1920 and joined the Lancashire Combination. In 1921, Borough turned professional when their application was accepted to play in the inaugural season of the newly formed Football League Third Division North. The team played in the Football League for ten seasons, with their most successful season coming in 1928–29, finishing fourth in the league and reaching the third round of the FA Cup. Wigan Borough folded during the 1931–32 season due to financial problems, and League football did not return to the town until Wigan Athletic F.C. were elected into the Football League in 1978.

The following list contains all the players who made at least one appearance for the club in the Football League. Appearances and goals for the 1931–32 season are also included, but have been expunged from official records.

Notes

References
 
 

Wigan Borough F.C.
Association football player non-biographical articles